Thanatopsis may refer to:

In literature:
 "Thanatopsis," a poem by William Cullen Bryant.

In film:
 Thanatopsis (film), an experimental film by Ed Emshwiller

In music:
 Thanatopsis, an American progressive rock band featuring musician Buckethead